Nestorović is a Serbian surname, a patronymic derived from the given name Nestor. It may refer to:

Pavle Nestorović (fl. 1689), Habsburg Serb commander
Nikola Nestorović (born 1868), Serbian architect and professor
Darko Nestorović (born 1965), Bosnian Serb football manager
Dušan Nestorović (born 1986), Montenegrin footballer
Marko Nestorović (born 1984), Serbian football midfielder
Teodor of Vršac, born Nestorović, Serbian Orthodox bishop
Daniel Nestor, born Danijel Nestorović (1972), Canadian tennis player

Serbian surnames
Patronymic surnames
Surnames from given names